Caterina Bonvicini (born 27 November 1974, in Florence) is an Italian writer. She was the recipient of the Rapallo Carige Prize for L'equilibrio degli squali in 2008. Her work has been translated into French.

Works
 Penelope per gioco, Einaudi, 2000.
 Di corsa, Einaudi, 2003.
 I figli degli altri, Einaudi, 2006.
 Uno due tre liberi tutti!, Feltrinelli, 2006.
 L'equilibrio degli squali, Garzanti, 2008.
 Il sorriso lento, Garzanti, 2010.
 In bocca al bruco, Salani, 2011.
 Correva l'anno del nostro amore, Garzanti, 2014.
 L'arte di raccontare, Nottetempo, 2015.
 Tutte le donne di, Garzanti, 2016.

References

External links
 Due parole, vi prego, sul romanzo: dialogo tra Jennifer Egan e Caterina Bonvicini, l'Expresso

Italian women novelists
20th-century Italian women writers
20th-century Italian novelists
21st-century Italian women writers
21st-century Italian novelists
Writers from Florence
1974 births
Living people